This is a list of women writers who were born in Uruguay or whose writings are closely associated with that country.

A
María Abella de Ramírez (1863–1926), journal publisher, columnist, feminist
Ethel Afamado (born 1940), poet, composer
Gladys Afamado (born 1925), poet, visual artist
Delmira Agustini (1886–1914), acclaimed 20th century Latin-American poet
Victoria Aihar (born 1978), author of erotic novels
Marcelina Almeida (ca. 1830–1880), writer
Claudia Amengual (born 1969), novelist, short story writer, essayist, educator, columnist
Teresa Amy (1950–2017), teacher, poet, translator

B
Ana Barrios Camponovo (born 1961), writer, actress, and illustrator
Lalo Barrubia (born 1967), poet and translator
Carolina Bello (born 1983), writer
Amanda Berenguer (1921–2010), poet, autobiographer
Matilde Bianchi (1927–1991), writer
Inés Bortagaray (born 1975), writer, screenwriter
Virginia Brindis de Salas (1908–1958), poet, columnist

C
Esther de Cáceres (1903–1971), poet, educator
Marta Canessa (born 1936), historian, academic writer 
Selva Casal (1927–2020), poet
Adela Castell (1864–1926), essayist, poet, teacher
Dorila Castell de Orozco (1845–1930), poet and teacher who wrote under the pseudonym Una Oriental
Gladys Castelvecchi (1922–2008), poet, literature professor
Maria Collazo (1884–1942) Educator & Journalist 
Marcia Collazo (born 1959), writer, teacher, lawyer
Enriqueta Compte y Riqué (1866–1949), educator
Helena Corbellini (born 1959), writer, literature professor
Cecilia Curbelo (born 1975), journalist, columnist, screenwriter

E
Paula Einöder (born 1974), poet, novelist, educator
Alicia Escardó (born 1963), writer, cultural manager
Gloria Escomel (born 1941), Uruguayan-born Canadian journalist, novelist, short story writer
María Esperanza Barrios (1892–1932), journalist, writer

F 

 Edda Fabbri (born 1949), writer

G
Eloísa García Etchegoyhen (1921–1996), non-fiction writer, educator
María Esther Gilio (1928–2011), journalist, writer, biographer, and lawyer
Marosa di Giorgio (1932–2004), acclaimed poet, novelist
Estela Golovchenko (born 1963), playwright

I
Juana de Ibarbourou (1892–1979), popular poet, feminist

L
Sylvia Lago (born 1932), writer, teacher, literary critic
Clotilde Luisi (1882–1969), lawyer, educator, translator, short story writer
Luisa Luisi (1883–1940), poet, teacher, literary critic

M
Mirta Macedo (1939–2012), writer, social worker, human rights activist
Circe Maia (born 1932), poet, essayist, translator, teacher
Amparo Menendez-Carrion (born 1949), Uruguayan-Ecuadorian author, academic
María de Montserrat (1913–1995), writer

O
 Susana Olaondo (born 1953), writer and illustrator
Gabriela Onetto (born 1963), writer, philosopher

P
Gladys Parentelli (born 1935), feminist theologian
Mariana Percovich (born 1963), playwright, teacher, theater director
Carina Perelli (born 1957), writer, political consultant
Cristina Peri Rossi (born 1941), novelist, short story writer, poet, translator
Amalia Polleri (1909–1996), poet, journalist, art critic
Alicia Porro (1908–1983), poet
Teresa Porzecanski (born 1945), anthropologist, novelist, short story writer, non-fiction writer
Carmen Posadas (born 1953), best selling novelist, short story writer, children's writer
Fanny Puyesky (1939–2010), writer, dramatist, lawyer

R
Mercedes Rein (1930–2006), dramatist, translator
Sara Rey Álvarez (1894–1949), lawyer, writer, feminist 
Ana Ribeiro (born 1955), writer, historian, professor
Alba Roballo (1910–1996), politician, poet
Carolina de Robertis (born 1975), Uruguayan-American author, teacher of creative writing
Cristina Rodríguez Cabral (born 1959), poet, researcher
Silvia Rodríguez Villamil (1939–2003), historian, feminist, writer, activist
Dora Isella Russell (1925–1990) poet, journalist

S
María Herminia Sabbia y Oribe (1883-1961), poet
Beatriz Santos Arrascaeta (born 1947), narrative writer, historian, essayist
Graciela Sapriza (born 1945), Uruguayan historian, educator
Concepción Silva Belinzon (1903–1987), poet
Susana Soca (1906–1959), poet
Armonía Somers (1914–1994), novelist, short story writer, feminist
Alcira Soust Scaffo (1924–1997), poet, teacher
Michelle Suárez Bértora (born 1983), transgender lawyer, politician, writer

V
María Eugenia Vaz Ferreira (1875–1924), poet, teacher
Helen Velando (born 1961), successful young adult writer
Idea Vilariño (1920–2009), poet, essayist, literary critic
Ida Vitale (born 1923), prolific writer, poet, non-fiction writer, essayist

Z
Giselda Zani (1909–1975), Italian-born poet, short story writer, critic

See also
List of women writers
List of Spanish-language authors

References

-
Uruguayan
Writers
Writers, women